The yellow-capped weaver (Ploceus dorsomaculatus) is a species of bird in the family Ploceidae.
It is found in Cameroon, Central African Republic, Republic of the Congo, Democratic Republic of the Congo, and Gabon.

References

yellow-capped weaver
Birds of Central Africa
yellow-capped weaver
Taxonomy articles created by Polbot